Sembower Field was a baseball stadium in Bloomington, Indiana.  It was the home field of the Indiana University Hoosiers college baseball from 1951 until 2012 and held 2,250 people.  It was named after a poet, former Indiana alumni, and avid baseball enthusiast  Charles Sembower.

Sembower Field was replaced in the spring of 2013 with a $19.8 million ballpark called Bart Kaufman Field at nearby Fee Lane and IN-46.

References
http://blogs.heraldtimesonline.com/iusp/?p=19059
https://twitter.com/hoosierbaseball
http://iuhoosiers.cstv.com/sports/m-basebl/spec-rel/021512aab.html
http://blogs.heraldtimesonline.com/iusp/?p=15082
http://iuhoosiers.cstv.com/genrel/081811aaa.html
http://iuhoosiers.cstv.com/sports/m-basebl/spec-rel/012312aab.html

Defunct college baseball venues in the United States
Baseball venues in Indiana
Indiana Hoosiers baseball